Tirukkannapuram Vijayaraghavan (30 November 1902 – 20 April 1955) was an Indian mathematician from the Madras region. He worked with G. H. Hardy when he went to Oxford in mid-1920s on Pisot–Vijayaraghavan numbers. He was a fellow of Indian Academy of Sciences elected in the year 1934.

Vijayaraghavan was well versed in Sanskrit and Tamil. He was a close friend of André Weil. He served with him in Aligarh Muslim University. He later moved to the University of Dhaka in protest at Weil's firing from AMU.

Vijayaraghavan proved a special case of Herschfeld's theorem on nested radicals: For 

converges if and only if

where  denotes the limit superior.

References

External links
 

Academic staff of Aligarh Muslim University
20th-century Indian mathematicians
Fellows of the Indian Academy of Sciences
1902 births
1955 deaths
Scientists from Chennai
Expatriates of British India in the United Kingdom